Mid-Columbia Libraries is a library system in Eastern Washington. There were 250,500 people in its service area in 2018, which spans the Tri-Cities metropolitan area except for Richland, which retains a city library: West Richland, Kennewick, and Pasco, and surrounding Benton, Franklin, and parts of Adams Counties are part of Mid-Columbia. It was founded in 1948, originally to serve patrons in unincorporated parts of the counties. , the last city to be annexed was Kennewick, and several cities which were still independent on paper, including Pasco and West Richland, paid Mid-Columbia to gain patronage rights for city residents. The system considered expanding to cover Walla Walla County Rural Library District in 2012.

References

External links

1948 establishments in Washington (state)
County library systems in Washington (state)
Tri-Cities, Washington